This page is a compilation of sports cars, coupés, roadsters, kit cars, supercars, hypercars, electric sports cars, race cars, and super SUVs, both discontinued and still in production (or will be planned to produce).  Cars that have sport trims (such as the Honda Civic SI) will be listed under the sport trims section.  Production tunes will include cars modified by outside brands and then sold. This does not include in-house brands such as Ford's Special Vehicle Team, which will be included in the main list.  Some vehicles are sold under different brands, therefore some vehicles may be listed more than once but usually link to the same page.  Different countries/continents may also classify vehicles differently.

List of sports cars

High-performance SUVs

Sport Trims

Production Tunes

Sports cars
Sports cars